Tropical Storm Aere, known in the Philippines as Tropical Storm Bebeng, was a mild tropical storm that affected eastern Philippines and southern Japan. It was the first named storm of the 2011 Pacific typhoon season. Aere is the Marshallese word for storm.

In the Philippines, Aere brought very heavy rainfall triggering landslides and floods knocking out power in several areas across Luzon.  More than 50 flights were canceled or diverted because of the bad weather conditions and President Benigno Aquino III delayed his flight home from a summit in Indonesia by a day. The coastguards have stopped smaller boats from leaving ports in Catanduanes and surrounding areas, leaving 1,379 people stranded. More than 7,200 hectares (17,800 acres - 27 square miles) of rice, corn and high-value crops costing more than 118 million pesos ($2.7 million) were destroyed or damaged. At least 35 people have been killed and two more are missing as a result of Aere. Agricultural losses are estimated at PHP1.37 billion (US$31.7 million).

Meteorological history 

On 3 May, the JTWC started to monitor a tropical disturbance that had developed within a monsoon trough about 140 km (85 mi) to the west of Palau. At this time the disturbances low level circulation centre was weak and unorganized, while a minimal amount of deep convection was observed around the system. Over the next couple of days the depression gradually developed further before it was declared a tropical depression by the JMA and the JTWC during 6 May.

Preparations

Philippines
Almost immediately after the PAGASA started monitoring the system, the NDRRMC raised storm warning signal 1 over the areas of Luzon and Visayas. The Philippine National Police were directed to continuously report the events to the NDRRMC as it happened. The Department of Health also alerted all the hospitals in the storm prone regions and asked them to sat in continuous coordination with PAGASA. Soon, the PDRRMC initiated evacuations across the Albay province with a population of 63,964 residing in 152 Barangays already evacuated as a pre-emptive measure. Also, the Armed Forces of the Philippines (AFP) deployed several assault vehicles and military personnel to closely monitor the situation across the nation and to haul rice for relief operations.

Taiwan
Officials in Taiwan issued a sea warning and informed residents on the eastern and southern parts of the island-nation about the torrential rain that Aere may bring. The Central Weather Bureau in Taiwan warned all ships in the Bashi Channel off the southern coast to brace for the storm reporting that the heavy rain may hit eastern and southern Taiwan triggering landslides and flooding.

Impact and aftermath

Philippines

Early on 8 May, Aere made landfall over Northern Catanduanes bringing very heavy rainfall across the nation. Around 210 passengers in the port of Lucena bound for Marinduque and 125 passengers in the port of Romblon bound for San Fernando, Romblon were stranded after their ships were cancelled due to heavy rains and rough sea conditions caused by the storm. More than 100,000 villagers fled from towns threatened by landslides. Aere triggered landslides and floods knocking out power in several areas across Luzon. Thousands were helped to flee from their farms around Mayon volcano in Albay province, which was threatened by landslides and heavy rains that have resulted in extensive flooding after the storm. A resident in Sorsogon province who was one of the victims expressed views on the storm, saying "The floods were so deep, they went past the head". More than 50 flights were canceled or diverted because of the bad weather conditions caused by Aere. President Benigno Aquino III delayed his flight home from a summit in Indonesia by a day due to the bad weather. The Disaster officials advised several villagers in the archipelago's agricultural regions situated in the north to stay prepared for landslides and flash floods after heavy rains poured by the storm. The coastguards have stopped smaller boats from leaving ports in Catanduanes and surrounding areas, leaving 1,379 people stranded after the NDRRMC's announcement that the security at coasts must be tightened. More than 7,200 hectares (17,800 acres - 27 square miles) of rice, corn and high-value crops costing more than 118 million pesos ($2.7 million) were destroyed or damaged. According to the National Disaster Risk Reduction and Management Council, at least 35 people have been killed and two more are missing as a result of Aere. Agricultural losses are estimated at PHP1.37 billion (US$31.7 million). Widespread flooding and landslides damaged homes, blocked off roads and severed communications. In Catarman, Northern Samar,  of rain fell in just 24 hours, resulted in significant flash flooding.

Retirement
Following the storm's severe damages and impacts in the Philippines, in June 2012, the PAGASA announced that the name Bebeng would be retired and will be replaced by Betty, which was first used in the 2015 season.

See also

Typhoon Noul (2015)
Typhoon Nida (2004)
Typhoon Songda (2011)

References

External links

JMA General Information of Tropical Storm Aere (1101) from Digital Typhoon
The JMA's Best Track Data on Tropical Storm Aere (1101) 
The JMA's RSMC Best Track Data (Graphics) on Tropical Storm Aere (1101)
The JMA's RSMC Best Track Data (Text)
The JTWC's Best Track Data on Tropical Storm 03W (Aere)
03W.AERE from the U.S. Naval Research Laboratory

2011 Pacific typhoon season
2011 disasters in the Philippines
2011 in the Philippines
Typhoons in the Philippines
Typhoons in Japan
2011 in Japan
Western Pacific tropical storms
Aere